Actinoposthia is a genus of acoels belonging to the family Actinoposthiidae.

Species:

Actinoposthia beklemischevi 
Actinoposthia biaculeata 
Actinoposthia caudata 
Actinoposthia longa 
Actinoposthia pigmentea

References

Acoelomorphs